Auxiliary metabolic genes (AMGs) are found in many bacteriophages but originated in bacterial cells. AMGs modulate host cell metabolism during infection so that the phage can replicate more efficiently. For instance, bacteriophages that infect the abundant marine cyanobacteria Synechococcus and Prochlorococcus (cyanophages) carry AMGs that have been acquired from their immediate host as well as more distantly-related bacteria. Cyanophage AMGs support a variety of functions including photosynthesis, carbon metabolism, nucleic acid synthesis and metabolism.

References

Genes
Virus
Metabolism